Adrian Derek Davis is a British economist and civil servant, who was the Governor of Montserrat from 2011 to 2015.

From 1989, he worked for the Department for International Development, and before that its predecessor, the Overseas Development Administration.

In March 2010, he was appointed Governor of Montserrat, replacing Peter Waterworth who was retiring from the diplomatic service. Davis was sworn in as Governor on 8 April 2011. His term as Governor ended on 8 July 2015. Elizabeth Carriere was sworn in as his replacement on 5 August.

References

Civil servants in the Department for International Development
Governors of Montserrat
Living people
Year of birth missing (living people)